Qaraqoyunlu (also, Karakoyunlu) is a village and municipality in the Barda Rayon of Azerbaijan. It has a population of 702.

References 

Populated places in Barda District